Saints Servandus and Germanus (d. 305 AD) were Spanish martyrs who are venerated as Christian saints.  They were killed near Cádiz.  Tradition states that they were from Mérida, and sons of Saint Marcellus the Centurion.  They joined the Roman Army and were imprisoned after being identified as Christians.  They made new converts in prison.  During the persecution of Diocletian, the vicarius of Mérida, Viator, tortured them and imprisoned them once again.  Viator then planned to take them to Mauritania Tingitana and had them walk barefoot and in chains from Mérida to Cádiz.  Viator failed to find a boat that could take them and they were decapitated on a hill of the fundus Ursianus in the conventus Gaditanus.  The body of Germanus was buried at Mérida and Servandus at Cádiz, and then later translated to Seville. The hill of fundus Ursianus has been identified with Cerro de los Mártires (San Fernando) and with Cerro de Torrejosa near Facinas (Tarifa).

Veneration
They are mentioned in the martyrologies of Bede, Usuard, Ado, as well as the Mozarabic Breviary, and in the Breviaries of Toledo, Seville, Salamanca, among others.  They are venerated as patron saints of Cádiz (officially since 1619).  On the Sunday closest to October 23 they celebrate in the town of San Fernando the festival of Saints Servandus and Germanus, carrying statues of the saints in a procession.

The sculptress Luisa Roldán (1650–1704), called La Roldana, made sculptures of these two saints at Cádiz.

Notes

External links

 CatholicSaints
 Santiebeati

People from Mérida, Spain
Saints from Hispania
Saints duos
305 deaths
4th-century Christian martyrs
4th-century Romans
Year of birth unknown